Karema may refer to:
 Karema, Burkina Faso, a village in the Bané Department of Boulgou Province in south-eastern Burkina Faso
 Karima, Sudan, a town in Northern State in Sudan some 400 km from Khartoum
 Karema, Tanzania, a former mission station in Tanzania